Aris Maliagros (also Aris Malliagros; 17 August 1895 in Argostoli, Kefalonia – 18  December 1984) was a Greek actor who played several aristocratic roles. He was famous as the "master with the monocle".

Biography
Maliagros studied at the school in the National Theatre. He appeared onstage for the first time at  Fioro of Levante (1914). He later appeared in  Christinaki (1916), A Chocolate Soldier (1918–19), Butterfly (1919–20), The Dance Countess (1922), The Misanthrope, Hamlet, King Lear, The Merchant of Venice, Cymbeline, The Merry Wives of Windsor, and Arravoniasmata.

Filmography

See also
Giorgos Gavriilidis
Hristos Tsaganeas

External links
Aris Maliagros at cine.nl 

1895 births
1984 deaths
People from Argostoli
Greek male actors
Greek male stage actors
Greek tenors
20th-century Greek male singers